Gustaf Nordahl (10 August 1903 – 10 November 1992) was a Swedish sculptor. His work was part of the sculpture event in the art competition at the 1948 Summer Olympics, winning a gold medal.

References

External links
 

1903 births
1992 deaths
20th-century Swedish sculptors
20th-century male artists
Swedish male sculptors
Olympic competitors in art competitions
People from Helsingborg
Medalists at the 1948 Summer Olympics
Olympic gold medalists for Sweden